Alvin Jones Jr. (born December 2, 1994) is an American football linebacker. He played college football at UTEP, and originally signed with the Baltimore Ravens of the National Football League (NFL) as an undrafted free agent in 2018. He has also played for the Saskatchewan Roughriders of the Canadian Football League (CFL).

Professional career

Baltimore Ravens
Jones signed with the Baltimore Ravens as an undrafted free agent in 2018. He was placed on injured reserve on August 31, 2018, and was released a week later. He was re-signed to the practice squad on October 15, 2018.

Jones signed a reserve/future contract on January 7, 2019. He was placed on injured reserve on August 31, 2019, and waived from injured reserve with an injury settlement on September 10.

Saskatchewan Roughriders
After two years away from football, Jones signed with the Saskatchewan Roughriders of the CFL on October 21, 2021. He was released on June 4, 2022.

Personal life
Jones is the fraternal twin brother of Green Bay Packers running back Aaron Jones; Alvin is older than Aaron by 30 minutes. Their parents, Alvin Sr. and Vurgess, were both career NCOs in the US Army, with a combined 56 years of service.

References

Living people
1994 births
American football linebackers
Baltimore Ravens players
Players of American football from El Paso, Texas
American twins
Twin sportspeople
UTEP Miners football players
Saskatchewan Roughriders players
Canadian football linebackers